Balsa is the tree Ochroma pyramidale or the light-weight wood it produces.

Balsa may also refer to:

Balsa (software), a free and open-source e-mail client for Linux
Balsa (moth), a genus of moths in the family Noctuidae
Balsa (Roman town), in present-day southern Portugal
Balsa (ship), South American boat made of reeds
Balsa, Brazil, headland near Manaus, Amazonas, Brazil
Balsa, Hungary, village in Szabolcs-Szatmár-Bereg County, Hungary
Balșa, a commune in Hunedoara County, Romania
Balsa, a fictional character in the anime and manga Moribito series
Balša I ( 1362), ruler of the principality of Zeta in what is now southern Montenegro and northern Albania and founder of the Balšić noble family
Balša II (died 1385), son and successor of Balša I
Balša III (1387–1421), last ruler of Zeta in the Balšić noble family
Walsa, Hispanicized spelling Balsa, a mountain in Peru

See also
"La balsa", 1967 song by Los Gatos
La Balsa, 1970 single-raft expedition
Las Balsas, 1973 multi-raft expedition